The 2007 Tour of Ireland took place between 22 August to 26 August. It was the first Tour of Ireland race to take place in fifteen years.
The overall classification was won by Stijn Vandenbergh who finished 20 seconds ahead of Marcus Ljungqvist.

Stages

References

External links
2007 Tour of Ireland at Cycling News

Tour of Ireland
2007 in sports
2007 in Irish sport